Instructional television (ITV) is the use of television programs in the field of distance education. Educational television programs on instructional television may be less than one half hour long (generally 15 minutes in length) to help their integration into the classroom setting. These shows are often accompanied by teachers' guides that include material to help use this program in lessons. Instructional television programs have historically been shown during the daytime on Public Broadcasting Service (PBS) stations in the United States. However, fewer public television stations devote their airtime to ITV today than they do in the past; these days, ITV programs are either seen on a digital subchannel of non-commercial educational public television station, or passed on to a local educational-access television channel run by a public, educational, and government access (PEG) cable TV organization.

Instructional television has been granted 20 microwave channels, administered by local educational institutions, through a service known in the US as ITFS, or Instructional Television Fixed Service.  Instructional television may also be programmed on terrestrial television stations.

See also

 Agency for Instructional Technology -- ITV program distributor
 Annenberg Foundation (Annenberg Channel)
 Washington County Closed-Circuit Educational Television Project
 William M. Brish, a leader of closed circuit instructional television in public school elementary classrooms.
 Educational films
 Educational television

External links 
 National Educational Broadband Services (EBS) Organization (formerly the National ITFS Association)
 Edwin G. Cohen had a distinguished career in educational and instructional television from 1955 to 1990. His positions included program associate for the Educational Television and Radio Center, director of the National Instructional Television Film Library, and executive director of the Agency for Instructional Television and its successor, Agency for Instructional Technology. His papers are housed at the University of Maryland Libraries

Public television in the United States
Television terminology